The Sexy Brutale is an adventure puzzle video game developed by Cavalier Game Studios and Tequila Works. The game was released for PlayStation 4, Windows, and Xbox One in April 2017. A Nintendo Switch version was released in December 2017. A cloud-based version was released for Amazon Luna in October 2020.

Gameplay
The Sexy Brutale is an adventure puzzle video game. The player is tasked with exploring a mansion that is stuck in a time loop and saving its guests before they are killed off.

Plot 
Lafcadio Boone, a preacher, wakes up during the yearly party that Lucas Bondes hosts in his casino mansion. A mysterious woman, called the Bloody Girl, has given Boone a mask that has ripped him out of an ongoing time loop that the rest of the other party members are stuck in over a 12-hour period, reliving their deaths over and over again. She has also given Boone a broken watch, that when the timer reaches the hour of 5, the day resets. Boone's task is to save the other party goers from their gruesome deaths before they happen by learning different ways over the 12 hour period by discovering clues, recipes, or items. The first man he saves, Sixpence, takes the watch and fixes it so that the full 12 hours of the day become available. Boone then sets out to prevent the other deaths.  Upon saving these other party goers, they remove their masks, talk to Boone to show they know him in some way. Boone then takes each mask, absorbing the powers they hold and giving him the means to save the other members and advance in the mansion.

After several party-goers have been saved, The Gold Skull, a man in a golden skull mask seemingly content on letting the actions play out, reveals himself as the instigator of the time loop. He reveals that the deaths that Boone has been preventing over the course of the 12 hour time loop, were created by the Gold Skull as a means to punish Boone. Both Gold Skull and Lafcadio are revealed to be aspects of Lucas Bondes, who previously had inadvertently caused the deaths of all at the party as part of an insurance scheme by destroying the casino. The player can choose to either relive their punishment, resulting in replaying the final scenes again, or for Lucas to forgive himself and move on, ending the game.

A secret ending can be acquired by collecting a deck of 52 cards scattered through the game and giving them to a demon at a hidden 'Old Habits' room of the casino. Doing so results in the casino going back to normal with the members alive. The player then approaches a decorated window and shatters it, bringing the party to a halt.

Development and release
The Sexy Brutale was developed collaboratively by UK-based studio Cavalier Game Studios and Spain-based studio Tequila Works. Cavalier Game Studios was founded in 2013 by several former members of video game developers Lionhead Studios and Mediatonic. They began work on The Sexy Brutale which was inspired by the film Groundhog Day (1993) and games such as Moon: Remix RPG Adventure (1997), The Legend of Zelda: Majora's Mask (2000), and Gregory Horror Show (2003), which featured time loops. After working on the game for around 2 years, Cavalier enlisted Tequila Works to assist them on the game's art and graphics.

The Sexy Brutale launched for PlayStation 4, Windows, and Xbox One on 12 April 2017. The game was released for Nintendo Switch on 7 December 2017, and for Amazon Luna on 20 October 2020.

Reception

The Sexy Brutale received "generally favourable" reviews from professional critics according to review aggregator website Metacritic. Justin McElroy of Polygon named The Sexy Brutale as his favorite game of 2017 praising the subtle storytelling and puzzle mechanics. The same website ranked the game 45th on their list of the 50 best games of 2017, while EGMNow ranked the game 18th in their list of the 25 Best Games of 2017. It was also nominated for "Best Setting" in PC Gamers 2017 Game of the Year Awards, and for "Best Puzzle Game" in IGN's Best of 2017 Awards. In addition, it was nominated for "Animation", "Music Design", and "Best Writing" at the 2017 Develop Awards; for "Game by a Small Studio", "Puzzle Game", and the "Creativity and Heritage Award" at The Independent Game Developers' Association Awards 2017; for "Game Engineering" and "Game, Original Adventure" at the 17th Annual National Academy of Video Game Trade Reviewers Awards; and for "British Game" and "Debut Game" at the 14th British Academy Games Awards.

References

External links
 

2017 video games
Nintendo Switch games
PlayStation 4 games
Video games developed in the United Kingdom
Video games developed in Spain
Video games with time manipulation
Video games about time loops
Windows games
Xbox One games
Indie video games
Adventure games
Puzzle video games
Single-player video games